Raymond Timothy Haley (January 23, 1891 – October 8, 1973) was an American professional baseball catcher. He played in Major League Baseball (MLB) from 1915 through 1917 for the Boston Red Sox (1915–16) and Philadelphia Athletics (1916–17). He also had an extensive minor league baseball career, spanning 22 seasons from 1910 until 1931, both as a player and manager.

A native of Danbury, Iowa, Haley was signed by the Red Sox out of the Western Illinois University. Most of his playing time came with the A's, serving as their third catcher behind Billy Meyer and Val Picinich in 1916, then Wally Schang and Meyer in 1917.

In his major league career, Haley was a .248 hitter (53-for-214) with 17 runs and 15 RBI in 81 games, including eight doubles, one triple, and two stolen bases. He did not hit a home run. As a catcher, he appeared in 71 games and collected 263 outs and 96 assists while committing 11 errors for a .970 fielding percentage.

Haley died in Bradenton, Florida at age 82.

Sources

1891 births
1973 deaths
Major League Baseball catchers
Boston Red Sox players
Philadelphia Athletics players
Minor league baseball managers
Richmond Pioneers players
Wheeling Stogies players
Evansville River Rats players
Des Moines Boosters players
Buffalo Bisons (minor league) players
Wichita Witches players
Nashville Vols players
Reading Keystones players
Wichita Izzies players
Wichita Larks players
Columbus Discoverers players
Western Illinois Leathernecks baseball players
Baseball players from Iowa